The World Barista Championship (WBC) is an annual barista competition operated by World Coffee Events for the title of World Barista Champion. The competition is composed of the winners of the national barista championships, which are operated by the Specialty Coffee Association (SCA) chapters, or an approved, independent, non-profit national body. First held in 2000, the event is hosted in a different city every year. The most recent edition in 2022 was in Melbourne, with the 2023 edition scheduled to be in Athens, Greece.

History
The first competition was in Monte Carlo in 2000. The WBC was dominated in its early years by Scandinavian baristas and was held in Europe or the United States from its inception until 2007 when it was hosted in Tokyo, Japan.

In 2016, significant changes were made to the competition format: Grinders were now provided by the competition's partner (Mahlkönig), new models of espresso machines were introduced, and the cappuccino was replaced by a "milk drink" component.

In 2018, Agnieszka Rojewska became the first woman to win the World Barista Championship.

The 2020 championship was due to take place in Melbourne but was cancelled because of the COVID-19 pandemic.

Competition format

There are three rounds of judging over two days. The first round included 55 national barista champions in 2018. The top 15 competitors advance to a second (semi-finals) round, plus the addition of a wildcard placing. The final round comprises the top scoring six baristas from the semi-finals round and takes place on the last day of the competition. In each round competitors present a 15-minute routine in which they must prepare and serve a total of 12 drinks: (4) espresso, (4) milk beverages, and (4) ‘signature beverages’ (a non-alcoholic espresso-based cocktail) to each of four sensory judges. Baristas commonly perform the same routine in each of the rounds that they compete.

The four judges award points on a variety of factors including the taste and balance of the barista's beverages as well as their presentation. A technical judge grades their technique and cleanliness in the national championships and preliminary rounds. The judges’ points are totalled to produce a final score for each barista in each round. The baristas with the highest scores advance from the first and second rounds, and the barista with the greatest score in the final round wins the title.

Organization
The WBC is operated by World Coffee Events (WCE), which was established by the Specialty Coffee Association of America (SCAA) and the Speciality Coffee Association of Europe (SCAE) to run a portfolio of international coffee events. Since the SCAA and SCAE have unified in 2017, WCE is a part of this global organization called the Specialty Coffee Association (SCA).

The national barista competitions are each organized by their respective national coffee organizations.

Past winners

References

External links
 World Barista Championship official site

Baristas
Brewing
Coffee preparation
Events in Melbourne
Food and drink awards
Coffee